Old West Tampa is a neighborhood within the city limits of Tampa, Florida. As of the 2010 census, the neighborhood had a population of 2,014. The ZIP code serving the neighborhood is 33607. The neighborhood is located in the heart of the West Tampa district.

Geography
Old West Tampa boundaries are Saint Joseph Street to the north, Interstate 275 to the south, Rome Avenue to the east and Armenia Avenue to the west.

Demographics
At the 2010 census there were 2,014 people and 715 households residing in the neighborhood. The population density was 5,779/mi2. The racial makeup of the neighborhood was 26% White, 64% African American, 1% Native American, 1% Asian, and 4% from two or more races. Hispanic or Latino of any race were 28%.

Of the 715 households 24% had children under the age of 18 living with them, 22% were married couples living together, 33% had a female householder with no husband present, and 10% were non-families. 26% of households were made up of individuals.

The age distribution was 25% under the age of 18, 23% from 18 to 34, 21% from 35 to 49, 18% from 50 to 64, and 13% 65 or older. For every 100 females, there were 99.4 males.

The per capita income for the neighborhood was $11,640. About 30% of the population were below the poverty line, 49% of those are under the age of 18.

See also
West Tampa District
Neighborhoods in Tampa, Florida

References

External links
Old West Tampa Neighborhood Association
Old West Tampa profile, from Neighbourhood Link

Neighborhoods in Tampa, Florida